Goodbye Dear Wife is a 2012 South Korean television series, starring Ryu Si-won, Hong Soo-hyun and Park Ji-yoon. It aired on Channel A from May 7 to July 10, 2012 at 20:50 for 20 episodes.

Plot
The series is about a judo teacher Cha Seung-hyuk (Ryu Si-won) who is married to Kang Sun-ah (Hong Soo-hyun) who wanted to be a nun. He had dreams for reuniting his first love, Oh Hyang-gia (Park Ji-yoon), cold-hearted woman.

Cast
 Ryu Si-won as Cha Seung-hyuk 
 Hong Soo-hyun as Kang Sun-ah - Seung-hyuk's wife who was raised by nuns
 Park Ji-yoon as Oh Hyang-gi - Seung-Hyuk's first love
 Julien Kang as Kang Gu-ra - rival fighter to Seung-hyuk
 Danny Ahn as Gye Dong-hee - Seung-hyuk's friend
 Kim Min-soo as Kim Hyun-chul
 Oh Joo-eun as Joo Ji-ae
 Lee Yun-kyung as Lee Hae-shim
 Jung Sung-mo as So Yong-dae
 Oh Mi-hee as Lee Ok-boon
 Lee Byung-joon as Gong Shin-boo
 Yoon Sung-min as Sung-min
 Jo Hye-soo as Oh Hyang-eun

Original soundtracks

Reception
According to AGB Nielsen Media Research, the premiere episode achieved a nationwide rating of 0.84 percent in viewership.

References

External links
 Goodbye Dear Wife official Channel A website  
 

Channel A television dramas
2012 South Korean television series debuts
2012 South Korean television series endings
Korean-language television shows